Douglas County Courthouse is a historic courthouse at 1616 Eighth Street in Minden, Nevada, United States. When the county seat moved to Minden from Genoa in 1916, architects Frederick DeLongchamps and George L.F. O'Brien were paid $700 to design a new courthouse. The building was finished the same year by contractors Friedhoff and Hoeffel for $25,000.

References

Government buildings completed in 1916
National Register of Historic Places in Douglas County, Nevada
Neoclassical architecture in Nevada
County courthouses in Nevada
Courthouses on the National Register of Historic Places in Nevada
Frederic Joseph DeLongchamps buildings
1910s establishments in Nevada